The following is a list of the MTV Europe Music Award winners and nominees for Best Latin America North Act. This category was almost always won by Mexico, except in 2017 and 2019 by Mon Laferte from Chile, and in 2018 by Ha*Ash from the United States.

Winners and nominees

2010s

2020s

References

See also 
 MTV Video Music Award for Best Latin Artist
 MTV VMA International Viewer's Choice Award for MTV Latin America
 MTV VMA International Viewer's Choice Award for MTV Internacional
 Los Premios MTV Latinoamérica
 Los Premios MTV Latinoamérica for Best Artist — North

Latin America North Act
Mexican music
Awards established in 2012